Hognaston is a small village and civil parish in Derbyshire, East Midlands, England.

Hognaston has a population of approximately 200; including Atlow and increasing at the 2011 Census to 366,  and has a play area, pub, church and a village hall.

Built on the side of a valley, which ends at the start of the river, it is made up of mostly newer houses but there are some older 17th and 18th century farm houses and cottages. Due to the dam at Carsington Reservoir, the lower part of the village cannot get mobile phone signal, digital TV through an aerial, or very good radio quality.
 
St Bartholomew's Church in the centre of the village dates back to the 12th century, the doorway and the middle section dates back to Norman times, shown by the stone carving over the door. This shows a bishop with crook, a lamb with cross, two fishes, a hog and other beasts. It is thought to represent the Agnus Dei. The church is home to Derbyshire's oldest church bell (early 13th century).

The village hall was built in 1982 from the stones of the houses submerged by Carsington reservoir.

Hognaston forms part of the Derbyshire Dales local government district.

See also
Listed buildings in Hognaston

References

External links
Hognaston's homepage
The Red Lion Inn's homepage
Discover the Peak District's homepage

Villages in Derbyshire
Towns and villages of the Peak District
Civil parishes in Derbyshire
Derbyshire Dales